The Augusta Southern Railroad  was established on May 1, 1893, through a reorganization of the Augusta, Gibson & Sandersville Railroad.

The railroad acquired the Sandersville & Tennille Railroad in 1894 and then in 1897 was leased by the South Carolina & Georgia Railroad. The lease ended in 1901 at which time the Southern Railway took control.

The Georgia & Florida Railway acquired control of the Augusta Southern in about 1918, and purchased the property directly on October 31, 1919. Part of the line was abandoned in 1934; the remaining portion is operated by Norfolk Southern Railway north of Hephzibah, Georgia.

References

Defunct Georgia (U.S. state) railroads
Predecessors of the Southern Railway (U.S.)
Railway companies established in 1893
Railway companies disestablished in 1919
1893 establishments in Georgia (U.S. state)
1919 disestablishments in Georgia (U.S. state)